Alfred Walter Adams, QC was a Manx lawyer who became the Clerk of the Rolls on the Isle of Man.

Biography
Adams was involved in the public life of the Isle of Man for over 25 years. He was articled to John Bluett, who was a leading advocate then practising on the Isle of Man. A member of a Debating Society which held its meeting in a room in Fort Street, Douglas, Adams won respect for his skills in debate spending considerable time working on his case.

Adams at once made his mark in his profession his progress said to of been steady and speedy, with Adams subsequently defending George Dumbell in the Chancery Court.
He was appointed as Deputy Attorney General by Charles Ogden, however on Ogden's death in 1866 the vacant post of Attorney General was filled by Sir James Gell. Continuing in practice, Adams was appointed Clerk of the Rolls of the Isle of Man in 1879.

For the last five years of his life, Adams was said to of been in declining health. He was predeceased by his wife, her death being said to have had a profound effect on him.

Alfred Adams died at his home on the evening of Saturday 18 November 1882.

See also
Clerk of the Rolls

References

1882 deaths
Manx judges